Beautiful Vampire is a 2018 South Korean fantasy film which is a re-release of the oksusu's web series with more cuts. It was released on October 8, 2018.

Plot
Ran is a 500-year-old vampire who chooses to live an ordinary life among human beings despite having powers such as speed. She runs a make-up shop in the neighborhood of Mangwon in Seoul, but her life is still different compared to other women as she does not age and needs animal blood to survive. Things change when Lee So-nyeon, the new landlord's son, falls in love with Ran: her appetite for human blood comes back.

Cast
 Jung Yeon-joo as Ran
 Song Kang as Lee So-nyeon
 Park Jun-myun as Kang Mool-joo
 Lee Yong-nyeo as Ok-bun

Release
The film premiered at the 2018 Bucheon International Fantastic Film Festival in the category Korean Fantastic: Features (Non-Competition) on July 13, 2018.

Critical reception
Pierce Conran of Screen Anarchy gave the following review: "Despite its appealing cocktail of quirk and genre conventions, Beautiful Vampire never quite goes beyond its modest ambitions as a light combination of popular genre conventions and lowbrow dramedy. Even at a svelte 72 minutes, it doesn't take long for the undemanding story and simplistic side characters to fall into repetitive patterns."

References

External links
 

ok.

2018 films
South Korean fantasy films
South Korean romance films
South Korean independent films
2010s Korean-language films
Vampires in film
Films set in Seoul
2010s South Korean films